Melvin Douglas Lastman (March 9, 1933 – December 11, 2021) was a Canadian businessman and politician who served as the third mayor of North York from 1973 to 1997 and 62nd mayor of Toronto from 1998 to 2003. He was the first person to serve as mayor of Toronto following the 1998 amalgamation of Metro Toronto and its six constituent municipalities. Lastman is also known for having founded the Bad Boy Furniture chain.

Early life
Lastman was born in Toronto in 1933, the son of Jewish immigrants from Poland, Rose and Louis Lastman. He began his sales career as a child, hawking fruit and vegetables at his family's Kensington Market grocery store.

He met Marilyn Bornstein when he was 16 and she was 13, and they were married five years later. He left school after Grade 12 and, with Marilyn's help, got a job at a College Street furniture store. He quickly established himself as a successful salesman. He switched to selling appliances and promoted himself as "Mr. Laundry" (alias the "Bad Boy").

Bad Boy Furniture
He opened a small frame building at Kennedy Road and Eglinton Avenue in Scarborough, Ontario, selling used appliances, and then, at age 22, bought out Heather Hill Appliances and established Bad Boy Furniture in 1955.

Having adopted the nickname "the Bad Boy" for himself, he developed Bad Boy Furniture into a chain of stores around the Toronto area. "Bad Boy" Lastman was associated with many publicity stunts, including travelling to the Arctic in the 1960s to "sell a refrigerator to an Eskimo." Lastman sold the chain in 1975 to run in the Ontario general election. The Bad Boy trademark was ultimately acquired by the large furniture chain The Brick but the new owners allowed it to lapse through lack of use until it expired.

In 1991, Lastman's son Blayne and business partner Marvin Kirsh re-launched the chain, over the objections of the senior Lastman, who felt the economic climate was unsatisfactory. The store was soon memorable to most Ontario television viewers who saw its commercials. The advertisements featured Lastman in a cameo appearance, Blayne in a striped prison uniform, and always ended with the line: "Who's better than Bad Boy? Nooobody!" In 2006 it was formally renamed as Lastman's Bad Boy and since as Lastman Bad Boy Superstore.

Mayoralty

North York
Lastman entered politics in 1969, when he ran for and was elected to the North York Board of Control. It was there he met another young motivated rising political figure, Paul Godfrey, who would later serve as Metro Chairman.

On December 4, 1972, Lastman was elected mayor of North York by defeating fellow North York controller Paul Hunt for the open mayoral seat.  Lastman took office on January 1, 1973, and was also automatically a member of Metro Council. Lastman was supported by many in North York for operating that city efficiently and effectively, and for keeping property taxes low. He successfully promoted the creation of North York City Centre, which became unofficially known as the "new downtown" of Toronto. At the North York Civic Centre , Mel Lastman Square is named after him.

While supporting development, he also supported the introduction of residential rent controls in the mid-1970s.

In 1975, Lastman ran for the Legislative Assembly of Ontario as a Progressive Conservative candidate. He lost to former Toronto Mayor, Phil Givens, who was running for the Ontario Liberal Party in the Armourdale electoral district. That provincial election was his only election loss throughout his career.

Lastman joined the Ontario Liberal Party in 1987, although he subsequently claimed that it was the result of a misunderstanding. He agreed to support Norman Gardner's bid for the Liberal nomination in Willowdale, and did not realize that he was also purchasing a party membership card in the process. He did not regret his accidental membership, but said he had no long-term loyalty to the party (Globe and Mail, April 28, 1987).

Lastman was a critic of Metropolitan Toronto's Metro Hall, attacking Metro Council's decision to locate the $220 million building downtown. He argued that it would be more equitable and would have been much cheaper to build the headquarters in the suburbs. Metro Hall was later passed over in favour of City Hall for the future amalgamated city of Toronto. An attempt to put it up for sale only received a maximum bid of $125 million which was far below the construction cost.

Throughout Lastman's political career, he was generally supported by the Progressive Conservatives and Liberals, such as Norman Gardner, Mike Colle, Mike Feldman, Joe Volpe, and David Shiner. Though usually opposed by the New Democratic Party, he did cross party lines to work with left-leaning councillors Jack Layton and Olivia Chow.

Post-amalgamation Toronto

In 1997, Lastman's position was abolished when the provincial government under Mike Harris amalgamated North York with Scarborough, York, East York, Etobicoke, and Old Toronto, creating a single-tier "megacity" forming the new City of Toronto. Lastman ran for the mayoralty of the "megacity" defeating incumbent Toronto Mayor Barbara Hall. Lastman's electoral victory was credited to his very strong base of support in the suburban cities, namely North York as well as in Etobicoke and Scarborough. Hall had won the majority of the vote in old Toronto, York and East York.

Lastman gained national attention after multiple snowstorms, including the January Blizzard of 1999, dumped 118 cm (46.5 in) of snow and effectively immobilized the city. He called in the Canadian Army to aid snow removal by use of their equipment to augment police and emergency services. The move was ridiculed by some in other parts of the country, fuelled in part by what was perceived as a frivolous use of resources, although Lastman's defenders noted that at the time the army was called in, Toronto was already at a standstill, and that the Environment Canada weather forecast called for another severe storm to hit the city later that week.

Lastman paid back the soldiers by giving them each a free pass to a Toronto Maple Leafs hockey game in honour of their hard work. These tickets were obtained free of charge due to an agreement with the Toronto Maple Leafs' management claiming that if these soldiers had not come out to shovel the snow, then the Leafs game that day wouldn't have had as many people attending. Ten years later, in 2009, Lastman gave an interview to the Toronto Star newspaper, stating he was proud of his decision to bring in the army during the Blizzard of 1999.

Some expected that Lastman would face Independent federal MP John Nunziata in the 2000 municipal election, but Nunziata dispelled the rumours when he found that he could not hold onto his seat in Parliament while campaigning for Mayor. Re-elected in November 2000, with an 80% majority, his closest opponent, civic activist Tooker Gomberg, drew just a little more than 8% of the vote.

Lastman shared Gomberg's three main campaign planks; namely, committing Toronto to 100% recycling diversion by 2010 to replace the controversial Adams Mine plan, agreeing with Prime Minister Jean Chrétien to end homelessness in Toronto, and appointing Jane Jacobs, the ethicist and urbanist, to head the Toronto Charter Committee to explore the potential for more autonomy for Toronto. Jacobs had publicly endorsed Gomberg.

Among his accomplishments as mayor of Toronto, Lastman brought World Youth Day to Toronto in 2002. He also succeeded in pushing the construction of the TTC Sheppard line, the first new subway line in decades. He played a key role in developing the Yonge and Sheppard area, notably in the negotiations that had the Empress Walk condominium complex developed and two leading schools refurbished, all without using public funds.

On January 14, 2003, Lastman announced that he would not run for re-election, citing deteriorating health. On November 10, 2003, David Miller was elected out of a field of five leading candidates to succeed Lastman as city mayor.

Lastman sometimes commented publicly on Toronto affairs, such as in 2007 when the city faced a $575 million shortfall and struggled to make service cuts to immediately save $100 million. Lastman also sympathized that provincial downloading had burdened Toronto, but also criticized Miller's service cuts as hurting the quality of life while not going far enough to solve the shortfall. Lastman pointed out that spending had increased by $1.5 billion since he left office, and suggested that councillors had to consider measures such as contracting out services and cutting staff.

Controversy
In 1993, Lastman saw Bill Clinton impersonator Tim Watters on television, and shortly afterwards contacted him and arranged for a commercial to be shot. The commercial featured Watters dressed as Clinton delivering the classic Nooobody! line.  While merely a mildly amusing commercial to most of the viewing public, Lastman's move attracted attention, as he soon received a letter from the White House requesting that he "cease and desist all unauthorized use of the likeness of the President of the United States of America in advertising of commercial services and products".  Lastman refused to stop airing the commercials, and even produced several more, featuring both Watters and Hillary Clinton impersonator Elaine Kouba. "Last time I checked," Lastman quipped, "this was Canada, not the 51st state."

After his wife Marilyn was caught shoplifting from an Eaton's store in Toronto, he threatened to kill CITY-TV reporter Adam Vaughan unless he stopped reporting on his family.

In June 2001, shortly before leaving for Mombasa, Kenya to support Toronto's bid for the 2008 Summer Olympics, he jokingly said to a reporter "What the hell do I want to go to a place like Mombasa?... I'm sort of scared about going out there, but the wife is really nervous. I just see myself in a pot of boiling water with all these natives dancing around me."  The remarks sparked a firestorm of controversy, with much speculation that they would offend African IOC members and endanger Toronto's bid. Lastman apologized profusely for those remarks.  IOC Vice-President Dick Pound later stated that the comments did not affect the outcome of the bid.

In January 2002, Lastman was ridiculed for hugging and shaking hands with members of the Hells Angels motorcycle gang when they held a convention in Toronto. Lastman later claimed that he didn't know that the Hells Angels were involved in selling illegal drugs.

During the 2003 SARS (Severe Acute Respiratory Syndrome) crisis, Lastman did an interview on CNN. When he was asked what the World Health Organization was doing about the crisis, Lastman replied "They don't know what they're talking about. I don't know who this group is. I've never heard of them before."

Personal life
In 1989, Lastman contracted hepatitis C during a surgery. He was one of thousands of Canadians infected from tainted blood products provided by the Canadian Red Cross in the 1980s and early 1990s. In his final year in office, he spent much of it dealing with his medical conditions, including a bout with cancer.

During his tenure as mayor, Lastman and his wife held a surprise news conference announcing that he had a 14-year-long extramarital affair with Grace Louie, a former Bad Boy employee. Louie, along with her two sons by Lastman, sued for $6 million claiming that they were his illegitimate children but had not received sufficient child support. Lastman denied responsibility for the two children and successfully fought them off when they tried to claim a share of his estate, although it was already revealed that he was indeed their father.

Following a brief illness, his wife Marilyn died on January 1, 2020, at the age of 84. Lastman died on December 11, 2021, at the age of 88. Lastman and his wife were both laid to rest at Mount Sinai Memorial Park in North York.

See also
Moose in the City

References

External links

City of Toronto – Mel Lastman profile

1933 births
2021 deaths
20th-century Canadian businesspeople
20th-century Canadian politicians
21st-century Canadian politicians
Businesspeople from Toronto
Canadian manufacturing businesspeople
Canadian people of Polish-Jewish descent
Jewish mayors of places in Canada
Mayors of North York
Mayors of Toronto
Metropolitan Toronto councillors